The Dublin AFL Division 2 or Dublin Adult Football League Division 2 is the second division of the top tier of Gaelic football in County Dublin. The winners will play in Dublin AFL Division 1 the following year.

Roll of honour

2